Split single may refer to:

Split single, a single that contains two tracks, both by different artists
Split-single engine, a variant on the two-stroke engine with two cylinders sharing a single combustion chamber
Split Single (band), an indie-rock band from Chicago, Illinois

See also
"Split Single with Happy Lounge Labelmates", a track on the 1998 album Four Lads Who Shook the Wirral by Half Man Half Biscuit